Ken Fogarty (born in Manchester, England) is a (naturalised) American soccer coach. Fogarty was Head Coach and Technical Director of the Cayman Islands national team from 1993 to 1994 and from 1996 to 1998.

Professional career
Fogarty began his professional career with Stockport County at the age of seventeen. He then moved to the United States to play for the Los Angeles Skyhawks of the second American Soccer League (ASL) in 1976, the year they won the ASL Championship. He returned to England to play for Stockport County until returning to the US in 1979 to play for the Fort Lauderdale Strikers of the North American Soccer League (NASL). He remained with the Strikers through the end of the 1983 season. When the Strikers moved north to Minnesota, Fogarty went with the team for the final NASL season in 1984. The NASL folded at the end of that season and the Strikers then jumped to the Major Indoor Soccer League (MISL). Fogarty continued to play with the Strikers until he joined the St. Louis Steamers for the 1987–88 MISL season. However, in 1988, the Fort Lauderdale Strikers were resurrected, this time playing in the third American Soccer League. Fogarty joined them for the outdoor season, then moved to the Baltimore Blast of MISL for the next three indoor seasons. In 1989, Fogarty left the Strikers for good and joined the Tampa Bay Rowdies of the ASL where he served as a player coach from 1989 to 1993. In 1990, the Rowdies joined the American Professional Soccer League (APSL). The team folded at the end of the 1993 season and Fogarty retired from playing professionally.

Coaching
While playing with the Rowdies, Fogarty also served as the team's head coach. In 1993, he was the APSL Coach of the Year. From 1994 to 1996 Fogarty served as the Technical Director for the Cayman Islands Football Association where he oversaw the youth and Olympic team programs. After a years absence, he assumed the position of Head Coach of the national team steering the full squad to their most famous victory over the Jamaica national team in the Shell Caribbean cup final. The Kansas City Wizards of Major League Soccer (MLS) signed Fogarty as an assistant coach in 1999. On 15 April 1999, the Kansas City Wizards named Fogarty as its interim coach after Ron Newman resigned following an 0–4 start. After the team hired Bob Gansler, Fogarty returned to his position as an assistant coach for the next two seasons. He later became the head coach of the Eclipse Soccer Club in Sugar Land, Texas, until he left this position to coach the Texans Soccer Club.

Ken is currently a Director for uScore Soccer in Spring, Texas.

National team
Fogarty played for the Republic of Ireland in the U-17 European Championships. He was also called up to the full squad for an international match against Poland, but did not play.

He is also President of Global Soccer International, a tour company offering professional soccer tours to Europe and South America for the club and college soccer player.(Globalsoccerint.com)

External links
 
 Strikers fan page
 NASL/MISL stats

American soccer coaches
English footballers
Sporting Kansas City coaches
Footballers from Manchester
English emigrants to the United States
American Soccer League (1933–1983) players
Los Angeles Skyhawks players
North American Soccer League (1968–1984) players
Fort Lauderdale Strikers (1977–1983) players
Minnesota Strikers (NASL) players
Major Indoor Soccer League (1978–1992) players
Baltimore Blast (1980–1992) players
American Soccer League (1988–89) players
American Professional Soccer League players
American Soccer League (1988–89) coaches
American Professional Soccer League coaches
Tampa Bay Rowdies (1975–1993) players
Cayman Islands national football team managers
1955 births
Living people
Tampa Bay Rowdies coaches
Sporting Kansas City non-playing staff
Fort Lauderdale Strikers (1988–1994) players
Stockport County F.C. players
St. Louis Steamers (original MISL) players
Player-coaches
Minnesota Strikers (MISL) players
Association football defenders
English expatriate sportspeople in the United States
Expatriate soccer players in the United States
English expatriate footballers